John Lodge (1792/93 – 27 August 1850) was the librarian (bibliothecarius) of the University of Cambridge from 1828 to 1845.

References

Cambridge University Librarians
Fellows of Magdalene College, Cambridge
19th-century English clergy
English librarians
1792 births
1850 deaths